The National Archaeological Museum is a museum located right on Piazza San Marco in Venice.

The National Archaeological Museum was established in 1523 by Cardinal Domenico Grimani. This Museum has a great collection of Greek and Roman sculptures, ceramics, coins and stones dating back as far as the 1st Century B.C. Some of the archeological collections from the Correr Museum are also housed here.

Visitors can also view the vases, ivories, portraits of ancient Roman emperors, marbles and busts, gems and jewelry in the museum. There are relics of Assyro-Babylonian, Greek, Tuscan, Roman and Egyptian origins from the Neolithic age. Visitors can also see the Armenian-Venetian collection, legal texts dating back to the 17th Century, and bilingual dictionaries.

Museums in Venice
Archaeological museums in Italy
National museums of Italy
Piazza San Marco